Methacrylyl-CoA is an intermediate in the metabolism of valine.

Thioesters of coenzyme A